Yun Daiying (August 12, 1895 – April 29, 1931) was an early leader of the Chinese Communist Party.

Early life
In 1913, Yun Daiying entered the private Zhonghua University in Wuchang, and after graduation in 1918, he stayed there as an instructor. In 1919, he participated in the May Fourth Movement in Wuhan. In 1920, he founded the Socialist Youth League of China with Xiao Chunü and others, and in 1921, he joined the Chinese Communist Party as one of the first batch of party members. In 1923, he became an instructor at Shanghai University. In Shanghai, he became a leader of the Communist Youth League of China and the chief editor of the periodical China Youth from 1925 to 1927.

Political career
In 1924, he joined under orders the Kuomintang (First United Front), promoting cooperation between the Communist Party and the Kuomintang. In 1925, he led the May Thirtieth Movement in Shanghai. He went to the Whampoa Military Academy in Canton in 1926, where he became a military instructor in the political department, aiding the work of Zhou Enlai. In the Northern Expedition of July, he stayed in Canton. In September after the North Expedition forces liberated Wuhan, he went to Wuhan to become the chief military instructor of the Republic of China Military Academy. After Chiang Kai-shek and Wang Jingwei launched a purge against the communists in succession in April and July 1927, he was sent to Jiujiang, where he helped organize the Nanchang Uprising.

In the end of 1927, he led the Guangzhou Uprising and was appointed secretary-general of the Canton Soviet Government. After its failure, he fled first to Hong Kong and later to Shanghai. In the end of 1928, he started to direct propaganda work of the communist party, creating the periodical Red Flag. In June 1929, he was elected as a central committee member in the 2nd Plenary Session of 6th Central Committee of the Chinese Communist Party. Due to his opposition to leftist mistakes within the party, he was demoted and appointed communist party council secretary of Shanghai Ludong District.

Execution
On May 6, 1930, he was captured and detained in Shanghai, and later in February 1931, he was detained in Nanjing. Initially, he did not reveal his identity. Right before he was to be rescued out of prison, he was identified and betrayed by Gu Shunzhang. After Chiang Kai-shek's men failed to entice or force surrender, Chiang ordered his execution on April 29.

Before his death, Yun Daiying wrote in prison a poem of martyrdom: 
Having roamed far and wide, I recollect old comrades,
Old comrades are immortal regardless of life or death,
I've dismissed personal loss, seeing it as negligible,
Preserving my heroic bent albeit serving as prisoner.

Statue 
His statue was erected at Central China Normal University.

References 

Diaries of Yun Daiying, Beijing: Central Chinese Communist Party School Press, 1981 (Chinese)
Chronicles of Yun Daiying, Wuhan: Huazhong Normal University Press, 2006 (Chinese)
Chinese Marxist Library: Yun Daiying

1895 births
1931 deaths
Central China Normal University alumni
Chinese Communist Party politicians from Hubei
Chinese revolutionaries
Delegates to the 3rd National Congress of the Chinese Communist Party
Delegates to the 5th National Congress of the Chinese Communist Party
Executed people from Hubei
Executed Republic of China people
People executed by the Republic of China
Politicians from Wuhan
Republic of China journalists
Republic of China politicians from Hubei
Writers from Wuhan